The Day of National Dignity was a holiday that was celebrated in Peru every October 9 in commemoration of the capture of La Brea and Pariñas by Revolutionary Government of the Armed Forces, the left-wing military junta that controlled the country at the time.

History

On October 9, 1968, the government of General Juan Velasco Alvarado emerged six days earlier by a coup against President Fernando Belaúnde, decided to solve the "Problem of La Brea and Pariñas" by nationalizing the oil industry. Through Decree Law No. 417066 and the military deployment of the First Military Region based in Piura, the government of the so-called Peruvian Revolution took the La Brea and Pariñas oil fields and the Talara refinery, in the hands of International Petroleum Company (IPC). The government expropriated the assets of the US company and expelled it from the country, although the IPC was later compensated.

The seizure of the facilities was officially announced the same day by a recorded message to the nation. The government officially baptized the date as the Day of National Dignity. With this action, the Revolutionary Government established itself in power and reoriented state policy towards the restitution of national sovereignty at the economic level and the recovery of oil for the interests of the nation.

After the Tacnazo of 1975 led by General Francisco Morales Bermúdez, the date fell out of use. The celebration was finally withdrawn from the national civic calendar when democracy was restored with the 1980 elections.

Use in Talara
The holiday continues to be celebrated today, known in Talara as the Day of the Oil Worker, where the date is commemorated with a Te Deum mass and a procession of the Peruvian flag and the Talara flag.

References

Revolutionary Government of the Armed Forces of Peru
October observances
1968 in Peru